Solute carrier family 22 (organic cation transporter), member 21 is a protein that in the house mouse is encoded by the Slc22a21 gene. The gene is also known as Octn3 and Slc22a9. Slc22a21 belongs to a protein family of solute carriers.

Model organisms

Model organisms have been used in the study of Slc22a21 function. A conditional knockout mouse line, called Slc22a21tm1a(KOMP)Wtsi was generated as part of the International Knockout Mouse Consortium program — a high-throughput mutagenesis project to generate and distribute animal models of disease to interested scientists — at the Wellcome Trust Sanger Institute.

Male and female animals underwent a standardized phenotypic screen to determine the effects of deletion. Twenty five tests were carried out on mutant mice but no significant abnormalities were observed.

References

Further reading 
 

Mouse proteins
Genes mutated in mice